XHTPO-FM (branded as La Caliente) is a Mexican Spanish-language FM radio station that serves the Tampico, Tamaulipas market area.

History
XHTPO received its concession on October 15, 1990. It was originally owned by Multimedios subsidiary Radio Diversión, S.A. de C.V.

References

Multimedios Radio
Radio stations in Tampico